The Netherlands women's national cricket team played Denmark in Germany in July 1998. The two sides played each other in 2 One Day Internationals, winning one match apiece.

Squads

WODI Series

1st ODI

2nd ODI

References

External links
Netherlands Women in Germany Women's ODI Series 1998 from Cricinfo

1998 in women's cricket
Denmark in Germany